Route 366 is a secondary highway in the Outaouais region of Quebec. It runs from Route 301 near Creemorne in the Pontiac to Route 148 in the city of Gatineau.

The section west of Lac-des-Loups is mostly unpaved. After skirting the northern boundary of Gatineau Park, the highway is briefly concurrent with Route 105 before continuing eastward. Near Val-des-Monts township it overlaps Route 307 for  before veering south towards Gatineau and its terminus with Route 148.

In 2011, Google Maps mislabeled Quebec Route 366 as running concurrent with the entire length of U.S. Route 30 from Astoria, Oregon to Atlantic City, New Jersey.

Municipalities along Route 366
 Ladysmith
 Lac-des-Loups
 La Pêche (Ste-Cécile-de-Masham)
 Wakefield
 Val-des-Monts (Perkins)
 Gatineau

Gallery

See also
 List of Quebec provincial highways

References

External links 
 Official Transports Quebec Road Map Network 

366
Roads in Outaouais